The Schools of Living Traditions (SLTs) are education institutions in the Philippines dedicated to indigenous arts, crafts and other traditions. 

The National Commission for Culture and the Arts (NCAA) under Felipe M. de Leon, Jr. launched its program on SLTs in 1995. The NCAA supports SLTs as part of the UNESCO's mandate to preserve living traditions of the indigenous peoples. SLTs are community-managed centers of learning headed by cultural masters and specialists who teaches knowledge or skills on a particular art, craft and tradition to the youth. The conduct of teaching in SLTs is often non-formal, oral and with practical demonstrations. There are currently 28 SLTs being implemented across the Philippines.

In 2021, the SLTs were included in the Register of Good Safeguarding Practices under the UNESCO Intangible Cultural Heritage List. The inclusion in the UNESCO list recognizes the efforts of the SLTs to safeguard traditional and cultural knowledge and practices from the potential negative effects of modernization.

External links
List of Schools of Living Tradition from the National Commission for Culture and the Arts

References

Art schools in the Philippines
1995 establishments in the Philippines
Educational institutions established in 1995
Intangible Cultural Heritage of Humanity